Hyacinth Flemmings (possibly Hyacinth Fleming) is a former cricketer who played one match during the 1973 Women's Cricket World Cup for the Jamaica women's national cricket team. Flemmings bowled two overs, conceding 11 runs, against Australia. She also batted at number 11, but did not score any runs.

References

Jamaican women cricketers
Living people
Date of birth missing (living people)
Place of birth missing (living people)
Year of birth missing (living people)